Fat Albert may refer to:

 Fat Albert, a character created by comedian Bill Cosby 
 Fat Albert and the Cosby Kids, an animated cartoon show featuring this character
 Fat Albert (album), a 1973 comedy album by Bill Cosby
 Fat Albert (film), a 2004 live-action film
 a Lockheed C-130 Hercules military transport aircraft used by the Blue Angels flight demonstration team
 Boeing 737, the older models were often referred to as "Fat Albert" due to its three-by-three fuselage width and short body
 Fat Albert, nickname of a Tethered Aerostat Radar System floating above Cudjoe Key, Florida